Morgan Creek is a stream in Blue Earth County, Minnesota and Brown County, Minnesota, in the United States. It is a tributary of the Minnesota River.

Morgan Creek was probably named for Richard Morgan, a pioneer who settled there.

See also
List of rivers of Minnesota

References

Rivers of Minnesota
Rivers of Blue Earth County, Minnesota
Rivers of Brown County, Minnesota